Tišnov is a town in Brno-Country District in the South Moravian Region of the Czech Republic. It has about 9,200 inhabitants.

Administrative parts
Villages of Hajánky, Hájek, Jamné and Pejškov are administrative parts of Tišnov. Pejškov, and Hajánky, Hájek and Jamné form two exclaves of the municipal territory.

Geography

It lies on the left bank of the Svratka river. Most of the territory lies in the Boskovice Furrow, but the northeastern exclave lies in the Upper Svratka Highlands and the southwestern exclave in the Křižanov Highlands.

History
The first written mention of Tišnov is from 1233, in a charter of the Porta coeli Convent in neighbouring Předklášteří. Tišnov was originally a market village located on an important trade route. It was owned by the Cistercian convert until its dissolution in 1782. Already in the 13th century, Tišnov developed into a small town.

In 1416, King Wenceslaus IV granted Tišnov the right to hold an annual market. It was burned down during the Hussite Wars in 1428 and damaged by the Thirty Years' War. It was also damaged by fires several times, the largest fire occurred in 1668. In 1788, Tišnov was promoted to a town. The town was affected by the passage of Napoleonic troops in 1805 and 1809, and by the Austro-Prussian War in 1866.

A railway line connecting Tišnov to Brno was constructed in 1885, and in 1905 the track was extended to Havlíčkův Brod. Until 1918, Tišnov was a part of the Austrian monarchy (Austria side after the compromise of 1867), in the district with the same name, one of the 34 Bezirkshauptmannschaften in Moravia.

From 1918 to the 1930s, the town experienced economic and construction growth. The town's debt has slowed down further development, which did not occur again until after the World War II.

Demographics

Transport
Tišnov is located on two railway lines of local importance, Tišnov–Brno and Tišnov–Nedvědice.

Sights

The town hall is the landmark of Tišnov. It was built in 1905 and replaced the original town hall from the 16th century. It is decorated by sgraffiti showing scenes from the history of the town.

The Church of Saint Wenceslaus was first mentioned in 1239. The wooden structure was replaced by a stone one in the 15th century. The church tower used to be a separate watchtower. The current form of the church is from the mid-19th century, when it was extended and connected to the tower.

Notable people
Božena Komárková (1903–1997), philosopher and theologian
Jan Richter (1923–1999), ice hockey player
František Sokol (1939–2011), volleyball player
Karel Řehka (born 1975), military leader

Twin towns – sister cities

Tišnov is twinned with:
 Moldava nad Bodvou, Slovakia
 Sereď, Slovakia
 Sulejów, Poland

References

External links

Tourist Information Centre Tišnov

Cities and towns in the Czech Republic
Populated places in Brno-Country District